Robert Wilberforce (31 July 1910 – 10 October 1987) was an Australian cricketer. He played ten first-class matches for Western Australia between 1926/27 and 1937/38.

References

External links
 

1910 births
1987 deaths
Australian cricketers
Western Australia cricketers
Cricketers from Perth, Western Australia